Samuel Bloom (born 19 December 1981) is an actor and singer best known as a member of the short lived pop group allSTARS*.

Early life

Bloom was born in Manchester on 19 December 1981. Graham Gouldman of 10cc was the first husband of Bloom's mother and remained a friend of the family. His uncle was a manager to bands including Herman’s Hermits and 10cc and his brother works in the recording business. He was privately educated at the independent Cheadle Hulme School and at 13 his English teacher got him a small role in the television adaptation of Pride and Prejudice as the young Wickham.

Work

Television acting

Television appearances

Stage acting

After the band
Bloom is the co-founder of 'Inspiring Interns', an award-winning recruitment agency for interns and graduates in Central London.

Bloom co-founded GradBay.com in 2018 with Ben Hazan, friends since nursery. GradBay is a hiring platform designed to help corporates engage the new work force, generation Z. GradBay works with Unilever, PepsiCo, Manchester United plus 100s of start-ups and SMEs. To date, they have placed thousands of students and grads into internships and jobs.

References

External links

1981 births
Living people
English male singers
English pop singers
English male stage actors
English male television actors
Allstars (band) members
People educated at Cheadle Hulme School
21st-century English singers
21st-century British male singers